The 1971–72 1. Slovenská národná hokejová liga season was the 3rd season of the 1. Slovenská národná hokejová liga, the second level of ice hockey in Czechoslovakia alongside the 1. Česká národní hokejová liga. 12 teams participated in the league, and ŠK Liptovský Mikuláš won the championship. TJ Slávia UK Bratislava and TJ VSŽ Košice B relegated.

Regular season

Standings

Group 1–6

Group 7–12

Qualification to 1972–73 Czechoslovak Extraliga

References

External links
 Season on avlh.sweb.cz (PDF)
 Season on hokejpoprad.sk

Czech
1st. Slovak National Hockey League seasons
2